Javier Calderón Alfaro (born 20 November 1971) is a Mexican former professional boxer who competed from 1993 to 1998. As an amateur, he competed in the men's bantamweight event at the 1992 Summer Olympics. A native of Reynosa, Calderón won six amateur national championships and a bronze medal at the 1991 Pan American Games.

References

External links
 
 
 

1971 births
Living people
Mexican male boxers
Olympic boxers of Mexico
Boxers at the 1992 Summer Olympics
Boxers at the 1991 Pan American Games
Pan American Games bronze medalists for Mexico
Pan American Games medalists in boxing
Place of birth missing (living people)
Bantamweight boxers
Medalists at the 1991 Pan American Games
Boxers from Tamaulipas
People from Reynosa
20th-century Mexican people
21st-century Mexican people